{{DISPLAYTITLE:C17H34O2}}
The molecular formula C17H34O2 (molar mass: 270.45 g/mol, exact mass: 270.2559 u) may refer to:

 Margaric acid, or heptadecanoic acid
 Isopropyl myristate (IPM)

Molecular formulas